KH Kastrioti  is a team handball club from Ferizaj. KH Kastrioti competes in the Superliga Meshkujt and the Kosovo Handball Cup, and it is one of the most famous handball clubs with traditional titles and champions.

Titles
Superliga: 
Winners (5): 1992, 1993, 2000, 2010, 2011

Kosovo Cup:
Winners (6): 1992, 2004, 2006, 2007, 2009, 2019

European record

External links
 

Kosovar handball clubs
Ferizaj